Sly was a Japanese heavy metal supergroup formed in 1994 by former members of popular groups of the Japanese metal scene. The line-up included singer Minoru Niihara and drummer Munetaka Higuchi (both from Loudness), guitarist Shinichiro Ishihara (Earthshaker) and bassist Koichi Terasawa. Sly disbanded in 1998, with Niihara and Higuchi re-joining Loudness in 2000 and Ishihara taking part in the reformation of his former group Earthshaker in 1999.

Band members
Minoru Niihara - vocals
Shinichiro Ishihara - guitars
Koichi Terasawa - bass
Munetaka Higuchi - drums

Discography

Albums 
 Sly (1994)
 Loner (EP, 1995)
 Dreams of Dust (1995) 
 Key (1996) 
 Vulcan Wind (1998)

Video albums
 Live Kingdom Come (1995) 
 Live Dreams of Dust  (1996)

References

Japanese heavy metal musical groups
Japanese hard rock musical groups
Musical groups from Osaka
Musical groups established in 1994
Musical groups disestablished in 1998
Heavy metal supergroups